Michael Joseph Staines (1 May 1885 – 26 October 1955) was an Irish republican, politician and police commissioner. He was born in Newport, County Mayo, his mother Margaret's home village, and where his father Edward was serving as a Royal Irish Constabulary (RIC) officer.

Staines was a member of the Irish Republican Brotherhood (IRB) and on its Supreme Council from 1921 to 1922. He served as Quartermaster General in the GPO during the 1916 Easter Rising and was later interned with his fellow insurgents at Frongoch internment camp. These men were served with internment orders under the Defence of the Realm Act 1914, which stated that they were "suspected of having honoured, promoted or assisted an armed insurrection against His Majesty". This meant that there were no charges, no court appearances and no pleas. Staines was elected Commandant of the prisoners after the former Commandant J. J. O'Connell was sent to Reading Gaol on 30 June. W.J. Brennan-Whitmore described Staines as: "a highly efficient officer who earned the love and respect of every individual prisoner." The attempts to conscript men in Frongoch to the British Army proved to be a serious source of disagreement between the prisoners and the camp authorities. The prisoners felt that it was ludicrous to expect Irish rebels to fight for Britain and the Crown. In addition, they were concerned that acceptance of conscription in Frongoch might be a prelude to the introduction of conscription in Ireland. Roughly sixty men in Frongoch had lived in Great Britain before the Rising and they were accordingly deemed liable for conscription. Staines, whom W. J. Brennan-Whitmore describes as maintaining "a very difficult position with remarkable efficiency and tact" throughout the conscription troubles which took place in Frongoch, took up a very resolute attitude on the question of identification. He asked Colonel F.A. Heygate-Lambert, Camp Commandant if he expected the prisoner leaders to identify comrades of theirs for military service in the British Army. To this Heygate-Lambert replied that it was the leaders' duty to identify men for all purposes. Staines retorted that by identifying the men for military service they would be lowering themselves to the level of spies and informers.

On his release from internment in Frongoch, he collaborated with Éamon de Valera, James Ryan, Eamonn Duggan and others in founding the New Ireland Assurance Collecting Society, in furtherance of the Sinn Féin policy of investment in Ireland. He was elected Director for Supply for Sinn Féin on 27 October 1917. He was also elected as a Sinn Féin MP for the Dublin St Michan's constituency at the 1918 general election. He attended Dáil Éireann, working closely with the legal side of government. At the 1920 Dublin Corporation election, he was elected as an alderman. He was re-elected in 1921 and 1922 for the Dublin North-West constituency. He later served in the Free State Seanad.

He was on the Grangegorman Psychiatric Hospital Board. He was the first commissioner of the Garda Síochána, of which he said,

Appointed in April 1922, he was forced to retreat from the Kildare Depot during the Civic Guard Mutiny by recruits the following month. Staines was replaced as commissioner by Eoin O'Duffy in September 1922. Prior to the formation of the Garda, Staines and O'Duffy had acted as liaisons between the RIC and the Irish Republican Police during the Truce which preceded the Anglo-Irish Treaty.

References

External links
 

1885 births
1955 deaths
Garda Commissioners
Early Sinn Féin TDs
Cumann na nGaedheal senators
Fine Gael senators
Members of the 1st Dáil
Members of the 2nd Dáil
Members of the 3rd Dáil
Members of the 1928 Seanad
Members of the 1931 Seanad
Members of the 1934 Seanad
Members of the Irish Republican Brotherhood
Members of the Parliament of the United Kingdom for County Dublin constituencies (1801–1922)
People of the Irish Civil War (Pro-Treaty side)
Politicians from County Mayo
UK MPs 1918–1922
Local councillors in Dublin (city)